Robert Vansittart may refer to:

Robert Vansittart, 1st Baron Vansittart (1881–1957), British diplomat
Robert Vansittart (judge) (1728–1789), British jurist and member of the Hellfire Club
Robert Vansittart, son of Henry Vansittart, Governor of Bengal, 1759–64, credited with scoring the first recorded century in cricket in India